The Australian Prudential Regulation Authority (APRA) is a statutory authority of the Australian Government and the prudential regulator of the Australian financial services industry. APRA was established on 1 July 1998 in response to the recommendations of the Wallis Inquiry.

Regulatory scope
APRA was established on 1 July 1998. It oversees banks, credit unions, building societies, friendly societies, general insurance, health insurance, reinsurance, and life insurance companies, and most members of the superannuation industry. It ensures that these institutions keep their financial promises; that is, that they will remain financially sound and able to meet their obligations to depositors, fund members and policy holders. APRA currently supervises institutions holding A$8.6 trillion in assets for Australian depositors, policyholders and superannuation fund members. APRA is largely funded by levies on the financial institutions that it supervises.

Executive
APRA is governed by an Executive Group, usually consisting of four people. All are statutory appointees. The current chair of APRA is John Lonsdale. Helen Rowell and Margaret Cole are Deputy Chairs. Suzanne Smith and Therese McCarthy Hockey are additional APRA Members.

History
The Insurance and Superannuation Commission (ISC) was formally established on 23 November 1987, following the proclamation of the Insurance and Superannuation Commissioner Act 1987.  The commission was based at the Australian Automobile Association Building, Canberra and also had offices in Melbourne and Sydney.  The Insurance and Superannuation Commission was absorbed into the Australian Prudential Regulation Authority on 1 July 1998.

In June 1996, the Financial System Inquiry (known as the Wallis Inquiry) was established to examine the results of the deregulation of the Australian financial system, to examine the forces driving further change, particularly technological, and recommend changes to the regulatory system to ensure an "efficient, responsive, competitive and flexible financial system to underpin stronger economic performance, consistent with financial stability, prudence, integrity and fairness."

At the time, the regulators of the Australian financial services industry were based on the institutions and not the regulatory function. APRA's predecessor regulators were the Insurance and Superannuation Commission, the Reserve Bank of Australia and the Australian Financial Institutions Commission (AFIC). The Wallis Inquiry recommended a new structure.

The role of the Reserve Bank of Australia (RBA) was amended to deal with monetary policy and systemic stability with the Payments System Board considering payments systems regulation. The role of the Australian Prudential Regulation Commission (later to become APRA) was amended to deal with prudential regulation of authorised deposit-taking institutions (ADIs), life and general insurance, and superannuation including Industry superannuation. The Corporations and Financial Services Commission was renamed and its role expanded as the Australian Securities and Investments Commission (ASIC) to deal with market integrity, consumer protection and corporations.

APRA was established on 1 July 1998 under the Australian Prudential Regulation Authority Act 1998.

APRA became prominent in the collapse of HIH Insurance in 2001 and for its investigation into the National Australia Bank foreign currency deal scandal in 2004.

APRA took over the previous role of the Private Health Insurance Administration Council in July 2015.

In 2018, Peter Harris, the chair of the Productivity Commission, was critical of the role of APRA in limiting price competition in banking. Representatives of APRA appeared before the Royal Commission into Misconduct in the Banking, Superannuation and Financial Services Industry during 2018.

In 2018, APRA created the restricted authorised deposit-taking institution (RADI) licensing framework to encourage new entrants and competition to the existing banking system.

Prudential Standards and Practice Guides 
APRA establishes prudential standards with which regulated institutions must comply. It also creates and maintains Prudential Practice Guides (PPGs) to provide guidance on APRA's view of "sound practice" in particular areas for specific industries, as well as areas common to most APRA-regulated entities ("cross-industry guides"). PPGs frequently discuss statutory requirements from legislation, regulations or APRA's prudential standards, but do not themselves create enforceable requirements.

See also

 Australian Securities and Investments Commission
 Four pillars policy
 Authorised deposit-taking institution
 Superannuation in Australia

Notes

References

External links 
Official site

Deposit insurance
Financial regulatory authorities of Australia
Commonwealth Government agencies of Australia
Prudential
1998 establishments in Australia
Government agencies established in 1998